The Suffield Block is an area located within Cypress County, southern Alberta, Canada approximately bounded by Highway 884 on the west, Highway 555 on the north, the South Saskatchewan River on the east and the Trans-Canada Highway on the south.  The Suffield Block is managed by CFB Suffield.

History

On 9 April 1941, following discussions between the Province of Alberta and the federal government, the federal government issued an order-in-council that authorized the Department of National Defence (DND) to enter into a lease arrangement for land within the Tilley East area. A matching order-in-council by the Province provided the Minister of Lands and Mines the necessary approvals to execute the leased agreement to the federal government for 99 years at a cost of one dollar per year to support the operation of the Experimental Station Suffield by DND.  However, the land to be leased by DND was not vacant.  A number of farmers and ranchers held rights to portions of the land by title and lease.  Under the agreement, the Alberta Government was to arrange with the owners and lease holders to vacate the land for financial compensation and land in other areas of the province.  DND agreed to provide the Province the funds to obtain the privately held lands at fair market value.  The Province sent agents to Medicine Hat to begin negations with the land owners.  However, it soon became clear that most land holders were not interested in selling their lands for the compensation offered.  The Province relayed this information to DND and the Federal Government made the decision to expropriate the land.

All non-Crown held land on the  area of the Suffield Block was expropriated by the Canadian federal government and included the cancellation of all lease arrangement.  The expropriation orders were filed on 31 May 1941 and 8 August 1941 at the South Alberta Land Title Office in the City of Calgary.

Upon the termination of the Second World War, provincial held lands within the "British Block" (or Suffield Block) was transferred from the province to the federal government in exchange for a large number of army and air camps and buildings from the Dominion government (War Assets Corporation).

The community of Bingville was the largest village effected by the creation of the Block.  The name of the community was drawn from a hat which resulted in naming the village after the comic strip Bingville Bugle.  The Bingville Bugle was written by humorist Clyde Newton Newkirk as a parody of a hillbilly newsletter complete with gossipy tidbits, minstrel quips, creative spelling, and mock ads.  In 1941, a Royal Canadian Mounted Police officer appeared in Bingville, which was not quite an oasis in the desert, but it was a pocket of better land and was graced with a little more rain.  Under orders from the federal government, by arrangement with Alberta, the Mountie bade the settlers to decamp within 30 days.  William Alfred Pratt, a trustee of the Bingville School, was one of the local farmers who had their property expropriated in the creation of the Block.

Brutus and Tripole were other communities within the Suffield Block.  Learmouth, Bemister and Kalbeck are place names along the Hanna – Medicine Hat Canadian Northern Railway grade within the Suffield Block that was never completed.

Two national historic sites of Canada are located on the Suffield Block.  The British Block Cairn National Historic Site is one of the best examples of a large boulder cairn and an important example of Niitsitapi cultural heritage.  The Suffield Tipi Rings National Historical Site preserves a dense concentration of tipi rings.

Named regions

Additional names not associated with a military event:  AEC Oil Access Area, Owl, Eagle, Lark, Hawk and Falcon.

On 19 June 2003, the Suffield National Wildlife Area (SNWA) was created and comprises the Amiens, Ypres, Casa Berardi and Fish Creek regions of the Suffield Block.

Alberta Homestead maps (circa 1918)

References

External links
 The Glenbow Museum contains photographs and other material concerning the Suffield Block.

Military of Canada
Science and technology in Canada
Geography of Alberta